Deh Now-e Ali Khan (also Romanized as Deh Now-e ‘Alī Khān and Dehnow ‘Ali Khan; also known as Ali Khan and Deh Now-e Malek) is a village in Jahanabad Rural District, in the Central District of Hirmand County, Sistan and Baluchestan Province, Iran. At the 2006 census, its population was 940, in 179 families.

References 

Populated places in Hirmand County